Mszanowo  is a village in Nowe Miasto County, Warmian-Masurian Voivodeship, in northern Poland. It is the seat of the gmina (administrative district) called Gmina Nowe Miasto Lubawskie.

The village has a population of 400.

References

Mszanowo